Chara elegans is a green alga species in the genus Chara.

References

External links

Charophyta
Plants described in 1906